Benjamin J. Smith (born May 14, 1967) is a former American football defensive back who played in the National Football League (NFL) for the Philadelphia Eagles, the Denver Broncos, and the Arizona Cardinals.  He played college football at the University of Georgia (after transferring from Northeastern Oklahoma A&M University his freshman year) and was drafted in the first round of the 1990 NFL Draft.

1967 births
Living people
People from Warner Robins, Georgia
American football cornerbacks
American football safeties
Georgia Bulldogs football players
Philadelphia Eagles players
Denver Broncos players
Arizona Cardinals players
Northeastern Oklahoma A&M Golden Norsemen football players